A by-election was held for the Australian House of Representatives seat of Angas on 20 June 1964. This was triggered by the resignation of Liberal MP and former Immigration Minister Alick Downer to become Australian High Commissioner to the United Kingdom. A by-election for the seat of Parramatta was held on the same day.

The by-election was won by Liberal candidate Geoffrey Giles.

Results

References

1964 elections in Australia
South Australian federal by-elections
June 1964 events in Australia